Hayley Faith Negrin (born April 9, 2003) is an American actress, best known for her voice work on the PBS Kids television series Peg + Cat.

Born in New York City, Negrin now resides in Weston, Connecticut, with her family. A performer since an early age, her professional career began in 2010 when she appeared in a national television commercial for Verizon. In 2013, she was picked from hundreds of girls to star in the lead role as Peg in Peg + Cat. Series creators Billy Aronson and Jennifer Oxley both stated that Negrin "sounded like a real kid, not too polished or over-rehearsed" and won the role "with her quirky voice and raw talent".

In 2014, Negrin won a Daytime Emmy Award for Outstanding Performer in an Animated Program for her work on Peg + Cat. She was the youngest Daytime Emmy nominee that year.

References

External links
 

2003 births
Living people
Actresses from Connecticut
Actresses from New York City
American child actresses
American television actresses
American voice actresses
Daytime Emmy Award winners
People from Weston, Connecticut
21st-century American women